Turks Head Ridge is a mostly ice-covered ridge in the southwest part of Ross Island, extending from Turks Head for a few miles up the slopes of Mount Erebus. Mapped by the British Antarctic Expedition (1910–13) under Scott and so named because of its association with Turks Head.

Ridges of Ross Island